Morgawr may refer to:

 Morgawr (folklore), a sea serpent hoax
 Morgawr (novel), a 2002 fantasy novel by Terry Brooks